A lagoon is a shallow body of water separated from a larger body of water by reefs, barrier islands, or a barrier peninsula. 

Lagoon may also refer to:

Arts and entertainment
 "Lagoon", a song by Nightwish from the 2007 reissue of the album Century Child 
 Lagoon (novel), by Nnedi Okorafor, 2014
 Lagoon (video game), 1990
 "The Lagoon", an 1897 short story by Joseph Conrad

Other uses
 Lagoon (amusement park), in Farmington, Utah, U.S.
 Lagoon catamaran, a brand of twin-hulled boat
 Lagoon Nebula, an interstellar cloud
 Lagoon River, in Dominica
 Lagoon, maker of the Choo Choo Bar confectionery
 Waste stabilization lagoon, a waste stabilization pond

See also

 Estuary